Interorbital Systems (IOS) is an American rocket and satellite manufacturer located in Mojave, California. The company was founded in 1996 by Roderick and Randa Milliron and is currently completing the development of the worlds lowest-cost orbital launch vehicles, the NEPTUNE, the TRITON, and the TRITON HEAVY. Interorbital Systems was engaged in developing a launch vehicle for the Google Lunar X Prize Team Synergy Moon  and for commercial launches. The company was also a competitor in the Ansari X Prize and America's Space Prize.

NEPTUNE Launch Vehicle: General
The two-stage NEPTUNE rocket uses high-performance liquid oxygen and densified propane propellants. The first stage is powered by four stationary throttleable ablatively-cooled liquid rocket engines, each generating 10,000-lbf of thrust.Throttling of the engines generates the pitch, yaw, and roll control moments required for steering. By using throttleable stationary engines instead of gimballed engines, the heavy and complex gimbals, gimbal actuators, and the gimbal actuator drive hardware are eliminated, substantially reducing the weight and complexity of the propulsion system. The second stage is powered by a single stationary ablatively-cooled liquid rocket engine generating 3,000-lbf of thrust. Cold-gas thrusters provide pitch, yaw, and roll control during the second-stage engine burn and on orbit. All of Interorbital's ablatively-cooled rocket engines are rapidly manufactured using a filament-winding process. These state-of-the-art composite engines are manufactured with the most advanced high-temperature resistant composite materials allowing the engines to be safely operated for up to forty minutes. They are more reliable and much lighter than the typical regenerative-cooled engines that use primitive nineteenth-century steam-engine technology for cooling and they simplify the engine plumbing and the multiple engine start process while on orbit.

NEPTUNE Launch Vehicle: Pressure-fed Propulsion System
The propellants are fed into the NEPTUNE liquid rocket engines by a proprietary pressurant system that does not require dangerous and heavy high-pressure pressurant tanks. This system design results in a propellant tank/pressurant system that weighs the same as an equivalent propellant tank/pressurant system/pump-fed system. By eliminating the propellant pump and its heavy electric or gas-generator pump-drive system, we have substantially reduced both the overall rocket development cost and the manufacturing cost and manufacturing time.

NEPTUNE Launch Vehicle: Exclusive Ocean-based Launch
All IOS rockets are launched from an ocean-going barge with motion compensation. Equivalent to a private spaceport, barge-launch eliminates the enormous cost of liability insurance when launching from the existing land-based spaceports and allows IOS to schedule launches based only on the weather and sea conditions. Initially our orbital flights will take place from the Pacific Ocean southwest of Los Angeles.

In 2006, IOS had an active Office of Commercial Space Transportation launch license for Tachyon, a sounding rocket designed for a 120-mile apogee suborbital flight.

Preliminary design concepts
 Solaris: an early-2000s suborbital rocket design that was initially IOS' attempt to win the Ansari X Prize. It was not finished in time and was beaten by Scaled Composites' SpaceShipOne.

Milestones 

 The CPM's main engine underwent its first successful static engine firing on October 28, 2012. The all composite-chambered engine performed with 7,500lbs of thrust, using nitric acid and turpentine.
 The Common Propulsion Module Test Vehicle (CPM TV) performed its first successful test flight on March 29, 2014. The payloads included two CubeSats, a Synergy Moon payload and a music CD by "ENCLOSURE" by former Red Hot Chili Peppers guitarist, John Frusciante. The rocket reached an altitude of 10,000 feet and will be reused for the next test flight. All payloads were recovered intact.

Satellite kits 
 CubeSat Personal Satellite Kit comes in both a standard 1 kg (2.2 lb) and a non-standard 1.33 kg (2.93 lb) configuration. Built of an aluminum frame designed for simple experiments, receiving and transmitting radio signals, or for personal use.
 TubeSat Personal Satellite Kit, a lower-cost alternative to CubeSats built wholly of printed circuit boards.
They claim that kits will be launched into 310 km (192 mi) self-decaying orbits where they will eventually burn up in the Earth's atmosphere. They have a large launch manifest for both kinds of launches.

Google Lunar XPrize 
Interorbital Systems was engaged in June 2016 as a member of and launch provider for Team Synergy Moon in the Google Lunar X Prize competition. The team's lunar rover was to have been lifted to the Moon's surface by a modified, 36-module version of the NEPTUNE rocket.

See also
Private spaceflight
Orbital spaceflight
Sub-orbital spaceflight
OTRAG, which used a similar modular rocket design
Mojave Air and Space Port
Team Synergy Moon
FreeFly Astronaut Project

References

External links
Interorbital Systems Official Site
Trans Lunar Research
Team SYNERGY MOON

Mojave Air and Space Port
Private spaceflight companies